Daik-U Township  is a township in Bago District in the Bago Region of Burma. The principal town is Daik-U.

History
Prior to the Second Anglo-Burmese War, the area around Daik U was composed of small villages. After the British built a railway between Rangoon (now Yangon) and Pyuntaza in 1878, with a railway station at Daik U, a bustling village emerged, accelerated by the construction of a highway between Rangoon and Mandalay in 1923.

Demographics

2014

The 2014 Myanmar Census reported that Daik-U Township had a population of 202,530. The population density was 157.3 people per km². The census reported that the median age was 25.9 years, and a sex ratio of 91 males per 100 females. There were 45,753 households; the mean household size was 4.3.

Attractions 

 Phayagyi, Waso Ward
 Shin Mothti Pagoda, Waso Ward
 Maha Wizitarama Monastery, Thandada Ward
 Seinpan Monastery, Waso Ward
 Kandaw Mingala Monastery, Thandada Ward
 Myo-u Monastery, Waso Ward
 Lawka Yanaung Pagoda, Shweindon Village-tract
 Clear of Conceit all around Pagoda, Taung Galay Village near Mile 74 (Yangon-Mandalay Exp.)

Notable residents
 Khin Myint Myint, Miss Burma 1961 winner and businesswoman

Moe Moe (Inya), Famous female writer 
https://en.m.wikipedia.org/wiki/Moe_Moe_(Inya)

References

Townships of the Bago Region
Bago District